Insomnia is an EP by Australian musician Washington. It is the follow up to her 2010 debut album I Believe You Liar. It was released on Mercury in 2011, and peaked at number 24 on the Australian ARIA Charts.

Track listing

Charts

References

Megan Washington albums